K&F Manufacturing Corporation (Kauffman & Fender) was a company started by Clayton Orr Kauffman and Leo Fender in 1945. K&F manufactured amplifiers and electric lap steel guitars. Very few of the K&F instruments have survived. The amps featured an 8" speaker with one input with a volume control or a 10" speaker with two inputs and controls for Volume and Tone. The amps were sprayed with a gray "crinkle" finish with bare wood at the bottom where a bracket held the box during spraying. Kauffman left the company in February 1946. The company then became Fender.

References

Fender Musical Instruments Corporation
Fender amplifiers